Tehrani (also Romanized as Tehrānī) is a village in Horgan Rural District, in the Central District of Neyriz County, Fars Province, Iran. At the 2006 census, its population was 64, in 15 families.

References 

Populated places in Neyriz County